Chen Xuyuan (born 1956) is the president of Chinese Football Association assumed office in August 2019. He was president of Shanghai International Port Group before being elected to serve as CFA president.

Election 
He was elected in the Xianghe National Football Training Center, Hebei at the 11th membership Congress conference meetings.

SIPG 
Shanghai International Port Group owned the Shanghai SIPG, a Chinese Super League club.

Chen did not serve in any sports administrative body before becoming the head of CFA.

Downfall 
On February 14, 2023, Chen was probed by China Communist Party's anti-graft watchdog Commission for Discipline Inspection for "serious disciplinary violation", which typically indicates corruption.

References

External links 
 
 

1961 births
Living people
People from Shanghai
Shanghai Maritime University alumni
Chinese football administrators
Delegates to the 11th National People's Congress
Delegates to the 12th National People's Congress